Sydney Margaret Stent (11 October 1875 – 19 April 1942) was a South African botanist. Stent's main interest was grasses

References

1875 births
1942 deaths
20th-century South African botanists
Agrostologists